DevaShard is a manhua series projected to run for a total of 25 graphic books, with each book being 52 pages long. The first book in the series is DevaShard: At First Light. It is the first publication from Fluid Comics.

The story is inspired by the ancient Indian mythological text the Mahabharata and focuses around the life story of the character Karna.

Bhumi

Bhumi is the world created by Fluid Comics in which DevaShard and the stories in other titles take place.

Publication

The series consists of:

At First Light

Film adaptation

DevaShard was optioned by Vanquish Motion Pictures in 2009 and is currently planned for full production. The movie released in late 2012 in the US with release in the UK, India and China in early 2013.

Notes

References

External links
 
 Bhumi World

Editorial on DevaShard: At First Light on Indian Comic Review
Bloomberg Live Interview, Bloomberg Television
Mumbai Mirror Article on DevaShard, Mumbai Mirror
The Standard, The Standard
Mint Article, Mint (newspaper)
Competition Winner
Interview with Spencer Douglass at Comic Con about DevaShard and Fluid Friction Part 1, Shazap.com, June 24, 2008
Interview with Spencer Douglass at Comic Con about DevaShard and Fluid Friction Part 2, Shazap.com, June 24, 2008
Introducing: Fluid Friction and DevaShard: At First Light, Newsarama, June 20, 2008
Fluid Friction Comics Interview, ComiPress, June 20, 2008

Films based on Chinese comics